Platylesches larseni is a butterfly in the family Hesperiidae. It is found in Tanzania (the Mpanda District). The habitat consists of riverine forests at altitudes ranging from 1,500 to 1,600 meters.

Adults males mud-puddle and feed from bird droppings. Adults are on wing from July to August.

References

Endemic fauna of Tanzania
Butterflies described in 1992
Erionotini